Complete is a box set compilation by English rock band the Smiths, released by Rhino Records in the UK on 26 September 2011. Standard versions contain the band's four studio albums (The Smiths, Meat Is Murder, The Queen Is Dead and Strangeways, Here We Come), a live album (Rank) and three compilations (Hatful of Hollow, The World Won't Listen and Louder Than Bombs), on 8 CDs or 8 LPs. A deluxe version contains the albums on both CD and LP formats, as well as 25 7-inch vinyl singles and a DVD.

Content
The box's liner notes state that "each album has been taken back to original tape sources and remastered by master-engineer Frank Arkwright, assisted by Johnny Marr at the Metropolis Studios in London". The discs in the CD version are presented in miniature vinyl replica sleeves, including the restored The World Won't Listen artwork. The project was managed by Gary Lancaster, who also worked on Total: From Joy Division to New Order and several other Warner Music Group releases.

Of the reissued albums, which were also released separately on both CD and vinyl, Marr said, "I'm very happy that the remastered versions of the Smiths albums are finally coming out. I wanted to get them sounding right and remove any processing so that they now sound as they did when they were originally made. I'm pleased with the results."

Cover art
The cover art features an image of four unknown women at a fairground, taken by German photographer Jürgen Vollmer in the early 1960s. Smiths singer Morrissey chose this picture because he felt the girls looked like the band members themselves.

Song omissions
Despite its name, this remastered compilation is not a truly complete source of Smiths recordings, as several officially released songs are missing on both the standard CDs and LPs. These include: 

 The live version of "Handsome Devil"
 The studio versions of "Accept Yourself" and "Wonderful Woman"
 The "London" version of "This Charming Man"
 The song "Jeane" from the "This Charming Man" single
 The group's three Sandie Shaw collaborations ("Hand in Glove", "I Don't Owe You Anything", & "Jeane")
 The live tracks from the "That Joke Isn't Funny Anymore" single
 The single mixes of "The Boy with the Thorn in His Side" and "Ask"
 The studio versions of "The Draize Train", "Work is a Four-Letter Word" and "I Keep Mine Hidden"
 The live cover of James' "What's the World"
 The 1984 John Peel sessions from the "Last Night I Dreamt That Somebody Loved Me" single
 The live version of "Some Girls Are Bigger Than Others"
 The early Troy Tate-produced cello version of "Pretty Girls Make Graves"

The "deluxe version" of the box set contains several of these tracks as part of the 7-inch vinyl set, but is still missing several studio and live tracks.

Track listing
All songs written by Morrissey and Johnny Marr, except:
"Take Me Back to Dear Old Blighty" (A.J. Mills, Fred Godfrey, Bennett Scott)
"His Latest Flame" (Doc Pomus, Mort Shuman)
"The Draize Train", "Money Changes Everything" and "Oscillate Wildly" (Johnny Marr)
"Golden Lights" (Twinkle)
"Work Is a Four-Letter Word" (Guy Woolfenden, Don Black, Cilla Black)

References

The Smiths compilation albums
2011 compilation albums
Rhino Entertainment compilation albums
Albums produced by Stephen Street
Albums produced by Grant Showbiz